GOW3 may refer to:

 God of War III, a 2010 video game for the PlayStation 3.
 Gears of War 3, a 2011 video game for the Xbox 360.